Anjelika Alexeyevna Krylova (born 4 July 1973) is a Russian retired ice dancer. With partner Oleg Ovsyannikov, she is the 1998 Olympic silver medalist and two-time (1998, 1999) World champion. She currently works as a coach and choreographer in Moscow, Russia.

Competitive career 
In her early career, Anjelika Krylova skated with Vladimir Leliukh and Vladimir Fedorov. With Fedorov, she won the bronze medal at the 1993 World Championships and was sixth at the 1994 Olympics.

In mid-1994, Krylova teamed up with Oleg Ovsyannikov. That same year they moved with their coaches Natalia Linichuk and Gennadi Karponosov to Newark, Delaware. Krylova injured her back in training shortly before they were set to leave for 1994 Skate America. The rink workers had forgot to close the gate and she stumbled as she skated backward. Aggravated by intense training, the injury would plague her throughout her career.

In their first season together, Krylova and Ovsyannikov won the Russian national title and took bronze at the European Championship. They were fifth at the World Championships.

During the 1995–96 season, Krylova and Ovsyannikov won silver at Skate America and gold at Nations Cup to qualify for the Champions Series Final (later renamed the Grand Prix Final) where they took silver. They also won silver at the Russian, European and World Championships. They were second at these events to Oksana Grishuk and Evgeni Platov.

During the 1996–97 season, Krylova and Ovsyannikov won three gold medals on the Champions Series at Skate America, Nations Cup and Cup of Russia. They qualified for the Champions Series Final in Canada where they were placed second to Canadians Shae-Lynn Bourne and Victor Kraatz. Krylova and Ovsyannikov won the silver medal at the European and World Championships, second at both events to Grishuk and Platov.

During the 1997–98 season, Krylova and Ovsyannikov won gold medals at Nations Cup and Cup of Russia but did not compete at the Champions Series Final. They won silver at the European Championships and followed it up with silver at the 1998 Olympics in Nagano, Japan. They were second at both events to Grishuk and Platov who retired after the Olympics. At the 1998 World Championships, they won their first World title ahead of Marina Anissina and Gwendal Peizerat.

During the 1998–99 season, Krylova and Ovsyannikov won gold at Sparkassen Cup (formerly Nations Cup) and Cup of Russia to qualify for the Grand Prix Final. They won the title ahead of Anissina and Peizerat. They won their first European title and then capped off their career with their second World title.

Krylova and Ovsyannikov were planning to compete the following season and had prepared programs and costumes, however, doctors advised her to retire due to a risk of paralysis stemming from her back problem. She suggested that he team up with another skater but he declined. After a year, she felt more confident and they began performing in the less demanding world of professional skating. They won the 2001 World Professional title.

Coaching career 
After ending her career, Krylova became a figure skating coach and choreographer alongside Pasquale Camerlengo. They worked for a year in Berlin, Germany, and in 2006, moved to work at the Detroit Skating Club in Bloomfield Hills, Michigan. In 2018, Krylova moved to Moscow, Russia, to coach with Albena Denkova, Maxim Staviski, and her former partner Oleg Ovsyannikov. She currently works with the following teams:

 Vasilisa Kaganovskaya / Valery Angelopol 

Krylova has previously coached:

 Alexandra Aldridge / Daniel Eaton 
 Federica Faiella / Massimo Scali 
 Adelina Galyavieva / Louis Thauron 
 Kaitlin Hawayek / Jean-Luc Baker 
 Madison Hubbell / Zachary Donohue 
 Madison Hubbell / Keiffer Hubbell 
 Alla Loboda / Pavel Drozd 
 Katharina Müller / Tim Dieck 
 Danielle O'Brien / Gregory Merriman 
 Alexandra Paul / Mitchell Islam 
 Nathalie Péchalat / Fabian Bourzat (May 2011 to May 2013) 
 Betina Popova / Sergey Mozgov 
 Kaitlyn Weaver / Andrew Poje 

Krylova, along with Giuseppe Arena, choreographed Johnny Weir's Dr. Zhivago program.

Personal life 
From 1994, Krylova resided mainly in Delaware, with some time also in Europe, before moving to Detroit, Michigan in 2006. She is a quarter Uzbek through her grandmother. She and Pasquale Camerlengo have two children, Stella, born in July 2005, and Anthony, born in September 2007. Stella and Anthony now live in Detroit with her mother, while Pasquale comes to visit the kids every so often.

Programs 
Eligible career with Ovsyannikov:

Show/professional career with Ovsyannikov:

Competitive highlights

With Ovsyannikov

With Fedorov

With Leliukh

References

External links

 
 Official website: Krylova & Ovsyannikov

1973 births
Russian female ice dancers
Figure skaters at the 1994 Winter Olympics
Russian people of Uzbek descent
Figure skaters at the 1998 Winter Olympics
Russian figure skating coaches
Russian expatriates in the United States
Living people
Olympic silver medalists for Russia
Olympic figure skaters of Russia
Figure skaters from Moscow
Olympic medalists in figure skating
World Figure Skating Championships medalists
European Figure Skating Championships medalists
Medalists at the 1998 Winter Olympics
Female sports coaches
Goodwill Games medalists in figure skating
Competitors at the 1998 Goodwill Games
Figure skating choreographers